HMAS Upolu was a submarine depot ship operated by the Royal Australian Navy (RAN) during World War I. She was built by Fleming & Ferguson, Paisley, Scotland in 1891, for the Union Steam Ship Company. She was requisitioned by the RAN on 18 August 1914 and converted into a submarine depot ship and after a short commission, she was returned to her owners on 9 December 1914. She was sunk in a collision with the Lienhsing off the Shantung Promontory on 12 August 1930.

RAN Service
On 18 August 1914 , Upolu was requisitioned by the RAN for use as a submarine depot ship. She returned to Sydney in November 1914 and was returned to her owners on 9 December 1914.

Fate
While transporting coal from Tsingtao to Newshang, she was sunk in a collision with the Lienhsing off the Shantung Promontory on 12 August 1930.

Citations

1891 ships
Ships built on the River Clyde
Ships of the Union Steam Ship Company
Submarine depot ships of the Royal Australian Navy